The 2017 Women's Indoor Asia Cup was the sixth edition of the Women's Indoor Hockey Asia Cup. It was held in Doha, Qatar from 24–28 April 2017.

The number of teams for this year’s cup wasincreased by one compared to the previous tournament where five teams competed. Cambodia and Hong Kong, who competed previously, not joined this year’s edition and be replaced by Malaysia, North Korea, and China.

Kazakhstan defeated Malaysia in the final to win the cup and secured a place in 2018 Women's Indoor Hockey World Cup.

Participating nations
Six countries participated in this year's tournament:

Umpires

 Frances Block (ENG)
 Emily Carroll (AUS)
 Hafizah Azman Nor (MAS)
 Thanittha Chuangmanichot (THA)
 Zarina Ilyassova (KAZ)
 Ornpimol Kittiteerasopon (THA)
 Weizhen Leong (SIN)

Results
All times are in Qatar Standard Time (UTC+03:00).

Pool

Classification round

Fifth place game

Third place game

Final

Final standings

See also
2017 Men's Indoor Hockey Asia Cup

References

External links
Official website

Indoor Hockey Asia Cup Women
Women's Indoor Hockey Asia Cup
Indoor Asia Cup
International women's field hockey competitions hosted by Qatar
Indoor Hockey Asia Cup Women
Sports competitions in Doha
21st century in Doha
Asia Cup